The Grand Lodge Č.S.P.S. of Baltimore is the Baltimore, Maryland chapter of the Czech-Slovak Protective Society.  The C.S.P.S. is a benevolent society that was founded to help Czech and Slovak immigrants integrate into American society.  The chapter was founded in 1880 by Vaclav Joseph Shimek, who was also the publisher of the Telegraf, the owner of Bohemian Hall, and a six-time president of Sokol Baltimore.

The Grand Lodge of Baltimore owns and operates the Bohemian National Cemetery in Baltimore. Over the course of a decade, the Grand Lodge Č.S.P.S. President C. Jeanne Táborský and her organization have worked to maintain and repair the cemetery grounds and turn a small building at the cemetery into a museum and cultural center. Since the neighborhood of Little Bohemia is long dispersed, the Bohemian National Cemetery is one of the few remnants of the Czech culture remaining in Baltimore, so the Č.S.P.S. has focused much of its energy on preserving the cemetery.

See also
Czech-Slovak Protective Society
History of the Czechs in Baltimore

References

External links
 Official webpage
 CSPS Flickr page

1880 establishments in Maryland
Czech-American culture in Baltimore
Czech-Slovak Protective Society
Culture of Baltimore
History of Baltimore
Organizations established in 1880
Secularism in Maryland
Slovak-American culture in Maryland